Avitus of Rouen (died 325), also known as Avitien or Avidien was the third Bishop of Rouen. He is venerated as a Saint in the Catholic Church.

Biography
He was the third bishop of Rouen in Normandy, however his two predecessors are accepted as legendary. He is the first historically attested bishop by his presence, with Materne II, Bishop of Cologne, at the first Council of Gaul in Arles in 314. He succeeds Mellonius and settles in Rouen from 314.

The Acta archiepiscoporum Rotomagensium tell us that "This blessed pontiff was an honest spirit, impeccable in his manners, and attentive to the salvation of souls under his charge".

He is buried in the crypt of the Church of Saint-Gervais in Rouen, and his feast day is celebrated on 2 December.

References

French Roman Catholic saints
3rd-century births
4th-century bishops in Gaul
Gallo-Roman saints
325 deaths